A sidewalk shed is a temporary structure or scaffold installed over a sidewalk. It is used to protect pedestrians from falling debris during the course of construction. As of 2022, New York City contained more than 300 miles of sidewalk sheds.

References

Scaffolding
Sidewalks